The Virginia Slims of Columbus is a defunct WTA Tour affiliated women's tennis tournament played from 1972 to 1973. It was held in Columbus, Georgia in the United States and played on outdoor grass courts.

Past finals

Singles

Doubles

External links
 WTA 1972 results archive
 WTA 1973 results archive

Defunct tennis tournaments in the United States
Clay court tennis tournaments
Virginia Slims tennis tournaments
History of women in Georgia (U.S. state)